HMS Barbadoes was a 16-gun vessel, the American Herald, captured in 1813. The Royal Navy took her into service as HMS Barbadoes She captured a number of merchantmen and privateers before she was paid-off in May 1816. In 1814–1815 she also captured three Spanish and French vessels carrying over 1100 slaves. Barbadoes became a powder ship in Jamaica that was later wrecked with her remains being sold.

American letter of marque
The British took Herald into service as the sloop-of-war HMS Barbadoes.

HMS
In March 1813 Lieutenant John Fleming commissioned Barbadoes in the Leeward Islands.

On 31 January 1814 Barbados captured the Swedish ship Gothland, and sent her into Antigua.Gothland was carrying corn and shingles.

On 11 April 1814 Fleming reported from English Harbour that Barbadoes had captured the American privateer sloop Polly off San Domingo after a 60–hour chase. Polly was armed with one 18-pounder gun amidships, and four 6-pounder guns. She had a crew of 57 men.

In July Barbadoes captured and sent into Tortola the Spanish ship Venus. Venus was carrying "400 Negroes" from Africa to Havana. A later notice of bounty money for the slaves records the name of the slave ship as Venus Havannera.

On 9 September 1814 Barbadoes picked up a schooner of unknown name, at sea. Then on 6 October Barbadoes captured the schooner Commodore Decatur, of 67 tons and 7 men.

On 2 November Fleming was promoted to the rank of Commander.

On 26 December  and Barbadoes captured the schooner Gallant Hull, of 10 men and 79 tons (bm).

On 11 January 1815 Barbadoes took the privateer schooner Fox, of 7 guns and 72 men. She was 12 days out of Wilmington and had taken no prizes. Barbadoescarried Fox into Barbados on the 1t4h.

On 5 February Barbadoes captured the schooner James Lawrence, of 175 tons (bm), and 16 men.

On 15 February  and Barbadoes captured the schooner Spencer, of 160 tons (bm), and 16 men.

The next day Barbadoes took the American letter of marque brigantine Vidette off St. Bartholomew. She was armed with three guns and carried 30 men.

On 28 February Barbadoes captured the schooner Nelson, of 76 tons (bm), and five men.

The following month, on 8 March, Barbadoes captured the American privateer brig Avon after a short action. Avon was pierced for 22 guns but mounted three 24-pounder and eleven 9-pounder guns; she carried a crew of 129 men. Barbadoes had four wounded; ten men were killed and wounded in the privateer. Avon arrived at Barbados on 14 March. Lloyd's List reported that Barbadoes had had one man killed and five wounded; Avon had had one man killed and five wounded. American sources reported that Avon had one man killed and four wounded, and that Barbados had one man killed and three wounded. Twenty-two of Avons men were aboard a small sloop that Avon had detached to seek prizes at St Kitts. The British captured the sloop the next day.

Barbadoes was reported at some point in April or early May to have detained three Bourbon (French Royalist) vessels bound from Martinique to Guadeloupe.

Barbadoes, Dasher, and  captured two French vessels, Belle Victoire, on 22 July, and Somnambule on 27 July. Also on 25 July, Barbadoes detained Junge Clara.

On 28 July Barbadoes detained Hermione and Belle de Bordeaux. The Vice Admiralty Court restored them to their owners. Still Barbadoes received a second payment of prize money for Junge Clara from funds that had been withheld to over the costs for the restitution.

Barbadoess last military action was her participation in the Invasion of Guadeloupe (1815). On 8 August 1815 Barbadoes, under the command of Captain Fleming, was part of the British force that captured Guadeloupe from Bonaparte loyalists. French Royalist troops from Martinique, two corvettes, and a schooner assisted the British. Barbadoes and several other warships covered the landing of the troops; they helped silence a shore battery and drive the defenders back from the beach.

On 8 August Barbadoes brought into Antigua a French Guineaman (slave ship). The slave ship had been bound to Guadeloupe with 515 slaves on board. This may have been the brig Virginie, which Barbadoes had captured on 15 July.

On 2 October Barbadoes and  brought a French brig into Antigua. The brig was carrying 208 slaves from Africa and some ivory tusks.

Fate
Barbadoes was paid off in May 1816. She became a powder hulk in Jamaica. She was later wrecked and her remains sold.

Notes, citations, and references
Notes

Citations

References
 
 
 

1813 ships
Ships built in the United States
Captured ships
Sloops of the Royal Navy